Coelebs in Search of a Wife (1809) is a novel by the British Christian moralist Hannah More. It was followed by Coelebs Married in 1814.

It is sometimes known by the title Coelebs in Search of a Wife: Commprehending Observations on Domestic Habits and Manners, Religion and Morals.

The novel focuses on Cœlebs, a well-to-do young man who tries to find a wife who can meet the lofty moral requirements laid down by his (now deceased) mother.

Coelebs in Search of a Wife was extremely popular when it was published. It combined its novelistic narrative with religious lessons, which helped it to become the first nineteenth century novel to be accepted enthusiastically by the large religious reading public (in Britain, the novel had often been seen as an unrespectable and even immoral literary form).

Maria Edgeworth, in an 1810 letter to Mrs. Ruxton, claims that the bachelor was modeled on a Mr. Harford of Blaise Castle.

Frank Muir said "it is now high on the list of the world's most unreadable books".

References

Further reading

PICKERING, S. (1977). Hannah More's Coelebs in Search of a Wife and the Respectability of the Novel in the Nineteenth Century. Neuphilologische Mitteilungen Helsinki, 78(1), 78–85.

External links
Text at Project Gutenberg

1809 British novels